Ian James Forrester Mortimer,  (born 22 September 1967) is a British historian and writer of historical fiction. He is best known for his book The Time Traveller's Guide to Medieval England, which became a Sunday Times bestseller in paperback in 2010.

Biography
Mortimer was born in Petts Wood, and was educated at Eastbourne College, the University of Exeter (BA, PhD, DLitt) and University College London (MA). Between 1993 and 2003 he worked for several major research institutions, including the Royal Commission on Historical Manuscripts, the University of Exeter and the University of Reading. His first publications were poems, published in various literary magazines. In 2000 his work '31 December 1999' was awarded the University of Exeter's prize for a 'poem for the Millennium', open to all present and past students of the university, and judged by the then poet laureate, Andrew Motion.

From 2003 to 2009 he published a sequence of biographies of medieval political leaders: first Roger Mortimer, 1st Earl of March, then Edward III, and Henry IV, in addition to 1415, a year in the life of Henry V. 

Mortimer's best known book, however, is The Time Traveller's Guide to Medieval England, first published in the United Kingdom in 2008. It was followed by The Time Traveller's Guide to Elizabethan England (which became a BBC TV series, presented by the author) and The Time Traveller's Guide to Restoration Britain. He is also well known for pioneering, in his first two books and an article in The English Historical Review, the argument (based on evidence such as the Fieschi Letter) that Edward II did not die in Berkeley Castle in 1327.

Mortimer has also carried out research into the social history of early modern medicine. His essay "The Triumph of the Doctors" was awarded the 2004 Alexander Prize by the Royal Historical Society. In this essay he demonstrated that ill and injured people close to death shifted their hopes of physical salvation from an exclusively religious source of healing power (God, or Jesus Christ) to a predominantly human one (physicians and surgeons) over the period 1615–1670, and argued that this shift of outlook was among the most profound changes western society has ever experienced.

In 2011, Mortimer entered the genre of historical fiction, publishing the first book from his Elizabethan era Clarenceux Trilogy using the pen name of James Forrester. James Forrester are Mortimer's middle names. His fourth novel, The Outcasts of Time, was published under his ordinary name: it won the 2018 Winston Graham Prize for Historical Fiction.

Since 1999 he has lived in the small town of Moretonhampstead in Devon, England, which is in Dartmoor National Park. In 2003 he was appointed by the Secretary of State Member of Dartmoor National Park Authority, representing the parishes. In 2009 he was reappointed as a Member by the Secretary of State, this time representing the national interest – a role which he continued to perform until 2017. Other public appointments have included the Lord Chancellor's Forum on Historical Manuscripts and Academic Research, 2011–17 (subsequently known as the Forum on Archives and Academic Research) and the Fabric Advisory Committee of Exeter Cathedral, 2011–16.

Personal life
Mortimer is the nephew of the British tennis player Angela Mortimer. Among his interests he includes running: in 2017 he wrote a memoir about the meaning of running, which relates the various lessons he had learnt from taking part in parkrun and half marathons – which was published as Why Running Matters: lessons in life, pain and exhilaration, from 5K to the marathon (Summersdale, 2019).

Views of Wikipedia
Mortimer is highly critial of Wikipedia and Jimmy Wales.

Honours
Mortimer is a Fellow of the Royal Historical Society (FRHistS). On 12 February 2015, he was elected a Fellow of the Society of Antiquaries of London (FSA).

Historical works (selected) 
 The Time Traveller's Guide to Restoration Britain: Life in the Age of Samuel Pepys, Isaac Newton and The Great Fire of London (The Bodley Head, 2017)
 What isn't History? Selected Articles and Speeches on Writing History and Historical Fiction (Rosetta (ebook only), 2017)
 Human Race: Ten Centuries of Change on Earth (Vintage, 2015; formerly published as Centuries of Change: which century saw the most change and why it matters to us by The Bodley Head, 2014) 
 The Time Traveller's Guide to Elizabethan England: a Handbook for Visitors to the Sixteenth Century (Viking, 2012) (paper: Penguin, 2013)
 Medieval Intrigue: Decoding Royal Conspiracies (Continuum, 2010)
 1415: Henry V's Year of Glory (The Bodley Head, 2009)
 The Dying and the Doctors: the Medical Revolution in Seventeenth-Century England (The Royal Historical Society, 2009)
 The Time Traveller's Guide to Medieval England: a Handbook for Visitors to the Fourteenth Century (The Bodley Head, 2008)
 "What isn't History? The Nature and Enjoyment of History in the Twenty-First Century", History, 93, 4 (October 2008), pp. 454–74.
 "Beyond the Facts: how true originality in history has fallen foul of postmodernism, research targets and commercial pressure", Times Literary Supplement (26 September 2008), pp. 16–17.
 The Fears of Henry IV: the Life of England's Self-Made King (Jonathan Cape, 2007)
 The Perfect King: the Life of Edward III, Father of the English Nation (Jonathan Cape, 2006)
 The Death of Edward II in Berkeley Castle, The English Historical Review, cxx, 489 (2005), pp. 1175–1214.
 The Triumph of the Doctors: Medical Assistance to the Dying, 1570–1720, Transactions of the Royal Historical Society, 15 (2005), pp. 97–116.
 The Greatest Traitor: the Life of Sir Roger Mortimer, 1st Earl of March, Ruler of England 1327–1330 (Jonathan Cape, 2003)
 Berkshire Probate Accounts, 1583–1712 (Berkshire Record Society, 1999)
 Berkshire Glebe Terriers, 1634 (Berkshire Record Society, 1995)

Historical fiction (writing as Ian Mortimer)
 The Outcasts of Time (UK: Simon & Schuster, 2017 US: Pegasus, 2018).

Historical fiction (writing as James Forrester)
 Sacred Treason (UK: Headline, 2010 US: Sourcebooks, 2012)
 The Roots of Betrayal (UK: Headline, 2011 US: Sourcebooks, 2013)
 The Final Sacrament (UK: Headline, 2012 US: Sourcebooks, 2013)

References

External links 
 Random House (publishers)
 United Agents (literary agent)
 Continuum (publishers)

1967 births
Living people
20th-century British historians
21st-century British historians
21st-century biographers
21st-century British novelists
Alumni of University College London
Alumni of the University of Exeter
British biographers
British historical novelists
British medical historians
British medievalists
Fellows of the Royal Historical Society
Fellows of the Society of Antiquaries of London
Historians of the early modern period
Historians of England
People educated at Eastbourne College
People from Petts Wood
People from Teignbridge (district)
Social historians
Writers from London
Writers of historical fiction set in the early modern period